= Gibraltar Photographic Society =

Gibraltar Photographic Society is a photographic society of Gibraltar. It was established in January 1965. Historically they met at the governor's residence. As of 2017 the president was Stephen Hermida.

It holds an annual awards ceremony and an annual National Celebrations Photographic Competitive Exhibition.

== Annual National Celebrations Photographic Competitive Exhibition ==
The exhibition is held at the Gustavo Bacarisas Gallery in Casemates. It consists of the following sections:

- Section A: Monochrome prints
- Section B: Beginners Section of Monochrome and/or Colour prints
- Section C: Colour prints
- Section D: Digital Photograph Images

The competition is open to anybody, with a maximum of six photographs. At the 2018 exhibition 242 prints were exhibited, and 109 digital images displayed. At the 2019 exhibition, 279 prints were exhibited along with 115 digital images. John Pirisfor won awards in 2019 for his works "Sarah-Jayne" and "Selfie", while Soraya Schembri won the award for Most Original Photograph for "Grater than".
